Bulbul is a 2019 Nepalese film that Binod Poudel directed and wrote. Abeeral Thapa, Bhim Thapa, Raju Paudel, and Purushottam Pandey produced the film under the banner of Awaken Production. The film stars Swastima Khadka, and Mukun Bhusal in the lead roles. The story line is about a woman who drives tempo for a living in Kathmandu. The film was released on 15 February 2019. It was selected as the Nepalese entry for the Best International Feature Film at the 92nd Academy Awards, but it was not nominated.

Plot 
A story about a woman who drives a tempo (3-wheeled micro-bus service). The film touches on topics of couples separated because one person leaves to work abroad, and life for the person who stays behind, among many other themes.

Cast 
 Swastima Khadka as Ranakala
 Mukun Bhusal as Chopendra

Awards

See also
 List of submissions to the 92nd Academy Awards for Best International Feature Film
 List of Nepalese submissions for the Academy Award for Best International Feature Film

References

External links 
 

2019 films
Cultural depictions of Nepalese women
Films shot in Kathmandu
Nepalese romantic comedy films
2010s Nepali-language films